Below are directors of the Royal Institution of Great Britain, with date of appointment.

Director of the Laboratory

 1801   Humphry Davy
 1825   Michael Faraday
 1867   John Tyndall
 1887   James Dewar

Director of the Davy-Faraday Research Laboratory

 1896   James Dewar
 1896   Lord Rayleigh
 1923   William Bragg
 1942   Henry Hallett Dale
 1946   Eric Rideal
 1950   Edward Andrade
 1954   Lawrence Bragg
 1998   Richard Catlow
 2008   Quentin Pankhurst

Director

 1965   William Lawrence Bragg
 1966   George, Baron Porter of Luddenham
 1986   David Philips (acting)
 1986   John Meurig Thomas
 1991   Peter Day
 1998   Susan Adele, Baroness Greenfield of Ot Moor
 2017   Sarah Harper
 2018   Shaun Fitzgerald
 2022   Katherine Mathieson

External links
 Management of the Royal Institution

Royal Institution, Directors
Royal Institution